Ampelokipoi B.C. or Ampelokipi B.C. is a Greek basketball club that is based in the Athenian neighborhood Ampelokipoi. It plays in the third local division (Γ ΕΣΚΑ), but in the past it has played in the top-tier Greek Basket League for two seasons. The club's colours are green and white, and its emblem is three circles, like Olympic circles.

History
Ampelokipoi was founded in 1929, originally as Hephaestus Athens. In the first post-war years, the club was renamed to Athletic Union of Ampelokipoi, and in the year 1954, the club merged with Niki Ampelokipoi, and was then renamed to Ampelokipoi Athletic Club. The club had departments in all popular sports in Greece: football, basketball, and volleyball. But the club was in the shadow of the nearby Panathinaikos club. 

Only during the 1990s, did the basketball team have some success, when it had Georgios Kalafatakis as head coach, and was promoted up through five division levels in five seasons, ultimately reaching the top-tier Greek Basket League. Ampelokipoi played in the top-tier Greek Basket League for two seasons (1994–95 and 1995–96), having notable players such as Tzanis Stavrakopoulos, Giorgos Floros, Lawrence Funderburke, and Ashraf Amaya in the team. After losing the most notable players of the team, the club then played in the Greek 2nd Division for the two next seasons. 

In those following years, the club's most notable player was Theo Papaloukas. Over the following years, Ampelokipoi started on a decline period, and the team ended up down in the local regional divisions.

Honours and titles

Domestic competitions
Greek 2nd Division
 Champions (1): 1993–94
Greek 3rd Division
 Champions (1): 1992–93
Greek 4th Division
 Champions (1): 1991–92

Notable players

Greece:
 Giorgos Floros
 Panagiotis Maragopoulos
 Theo Papaloukas
 Tzanis Stavrakopoulos

Americas:
 Ashraf Amaya
 Lawrence Funderburke
 Aaron Williams
 Ian Lockhart

Head coaches
 Georgios Kalafatakis

Men's football club
Ampelokipoi's football team, Ampelokipoi F.C. did not manage to have the same kind of successes as the basketball club did. In 2003, the football team of Ampelokipoi merged with the local team Pyrsos, and was then renamed to Athletic Culture Club of Ampelokipoi (Αθλητικός Πολιτιστικός Σύλλογος Αμπελοκήπων).

References

External links
 www.abelokipoi.gr 

Basketball teams in Athens